Copeina osgoodi is a species of fish in the Copeina genus found in the upper Amazon basin. They grow no more than a few centimeters.

The fish is named in honor of zoologist William Hudson Osgood (1875-1947) of the Field Museum of Natural History in Chicago, who collected the type specimen.

References

External links
 

Fish of Brazil
Lebiasinidae
Taxa named by Carl H. Eigenmann